Charles O'Conor may refer to:
 Charles O'Conor (historian) (1710–1791), Irish writer, historian, and antiquarian
 Charles O'Conor (priest) (1764–1828), Irish priest and historian, grandson of the above
 Charles O'Conor (American politician) (1804–1884), American lawyer and 1872 presidential candidate
 Charles Owen O'Conor (1838–1906), Irish MP

See also
 Charles O'Connor (disambiguation)
 Charles Connor (disambiguation)